William "Rusty" Ruthven, VC (21 May 1893 – 12 January 1970) was an Australian soldier and state Labor politician. For actions in the First World War he was an Australian recipient of the Victoria Cross, the highest award for gallantry in the face of the enemy that can be awarded to British and Commonwealth forces.

Early life
Born in Collingwood, Victoria, William Ruthven was educated locally at the Vere Street State School. He became a mechanical engineer and was employed in the timber industry prior to his enlistment in the Australian Imperial Force in April 1915 for service in the First World War.

First World War
Ruthven was 24 years old, and a sergeant in the 22nd Battalion, 2nd Division, when at Ville-sur-Ancre on 19 May 1918 the following deed took place for which he was awarded the Victoria Cross. The full citation for his actions appeared in a supplement to the London Gazette on 11 July 1918:

He was wounded in June 1918 and in July was commissioned as a second lieutenant. Later in the war he returned to Australia and was promoted to lieutenant and campaigned with other VC winners on a recruiting drive. He was demobilised in December 1918. In early 1919, his VC was stolen from his home, along with several other items. Police arrested the culprits and the medal was returned with a note apologising for the theft.

Later years
Ruthven was the timekeeper for the Collingwood Football Club from 1939 until his death. His nephew Allan Ruthven played for Fitzroy.

During the Second World War, Ruthven served in Australia with several garrison units, including the 3rd Australian Garrison Battalion, and was based at Murchison, which was the largest prisoner of war camp in Victoria. He achieved the rank of major.

He was elected a councillor in the Melbourne municipality of Collingwood, and in 1945 was elected as mayor. He sat in the Victorian Legislative Assembly from 1945 until 1955 as the Labor Party member for the electoral district of Preston, then following a redistribution, represented the electoral district of Reservoir until his retirement in 1961.

His Victoria Cross is displayed at the Australian War Memorial in Canberra. The Ruthven Soldiers' Club in Broadmeadows was opened in his honour in 1959, and in 1963 the Ruthven railway station near Reservoir was named after him.

References

|-

1893 births
1970 deaths
Military personnel from Melbourne
20th-century Australian politicians
Australian Army officers
Australian Labor Party members of the Parliament of Victoria
Australian Army personnel of World War II
Australian World War I recipients of the Victoria Cross
Members of the Victorian Legislative Assembly
Politicians from Melbourne
People from Collingwood, Victoria